Louise Ridderström (born 24 December 1993) is a Swedish professional golfer who plays on the LPGA Tour.

Early life and amateur career
Ridderström was born in Stockholm to a gymnast mother and a father (sv:Lars-Erik) who was member of the Swedish National Hockey Team. She started playing golf at the age of six, and played NCAA Division 1 college golf with the UCLA Bruins women's golf team at the University of California, Los Angeles between 2012 and 2016.

An accomplished junior golfer, she was part of the Swedish National Team and finished 4th at the European Girls' Team Championship in 2010 and 5th in 2011. She appeared twice at the European Ladies' Team Championship, finishing 5th both times. In 2015 her team lost in the quarter final to the Swiss team which included Kim Métraux, Morgane Métraux and Albane Valenzuela. In 2016 they lost to an English team with Alice Hewson, Bronte Law and Meghan MacLaren, after Ridderström finished third individually in the stroke play.

Ridderström also represented Sweden at the 2014 Espirito Santo Trophy in Japan, where her team with Madelene Sagström and Linnea Ström tied for 5th alongside the U.S. team. She finished 3rd at the 2010 Spanish International Ladies Amateur Championship and in 2015 she was runner-up at the Swedish Matchplay Championship at Ullna Golf Club, losing the final to Camilla Lennarth 6 & 5.

Professional career
Ridderström turned professional in 2016 after graduating from UCLA, and joined the Symetra Tour in 2017. On the 2018 Symetra Tour, Ridderström made 15 cuts in 20 starts, winning her first professional event at the Valley Forge Invitational and recording three additional top-10 results.

She finished T36 at the inaugural LPGA Q-Series to earn Priority List Category 14 status for the 2019 LPGA Tour where she started in 16 events and made eight cuts to rank 121st. Her best result was a tie for 18th at LPGA Mediheal Championship where she was in contention at −4 until shooting a final round of 75.

Ridderström spent 2022 on the Epson Tour, where she made 12 cuts in 18 starts with a season-best result of T5 at the Carolina Golf Classic. She secured a return to the 2023 LPGA Tour by finishing T34 at Q-Series.

Amateur wins
2016 Bruin Wave Invitational

Source:

Professional wins

Symetra Tour wins

Team appearances
Amateur
European Young Masters (representing Sweden): 2009 
European Girls' Team Championship (representing Sweden): 2010, 2011
Espirito Santo Trophy (representing Sweden): 2014
European Ladies' Team Championship (representing Sweden): 2015, 2016

References

External links

Swedish female golfers
UCLA Bruins women's golfers
LPGA Tour golfers
Golfers from Stockholm
People from Danderyd Municipality
1993 births
Living people